Ani ng Dangal or "Harvest of Honors" is an organizational award given by the National Commission for Culture and the Arts, an agency under the Office of the President of the Republic of the Philippines. It is an annual event in the Philippines celebrated as a highlight and concluding rite of the Philippine Arts Festival.

Philippine Arts Festival
February of every year is National Arts Month in the Philippines. Then President Corazon C. Aquino made this declaration in 1991 via Presidential Decree 683. For two decades the NCCA has been supporting various local projects and special events during National Arts Month to showcase the best of the Philippine artistic and cultural scene.

In 2009, the NCCA elevated what has been a national undertaking into a consolidated international event that is the Philippine Arts Festival (PAF). PAF is the NCCA's contribution to the celebration of National Arts Month. Its tagline is “Ani ng Sining”, and the festival has proven through the years that is indeed a harvest for the arts.

The Ani ng Dangal is given to a natural-born Filipino artist or group that has reaped top honors in international events. Its coverage includes the seven art disciplines:
 Architecture and Allied Arts
 Cinema
 Dance
 Dramatic Arts
 Literary Arts
 Music
 Visual Arts
including Multi-Disciplinary Arts

Guidelines

Recipients

2020 
12th Ani ng Dangal Awards: Awards were given by the National Commission for Culture and the Arts  (NCCA) to 1 artist for Architecture and the Allied Arts, 17 acts in Cinema, 7 awards in Dance, 3 in Literary Arts, 8 in Music, and 16 in Visual Arts.

Architecture

 Mactan Cebu International Airport Terminal 2

Cinema

 Angeli Bayani
Alden Richards
 Barbara Miguel
 Crisel Consunji
Dante Rivero
Judy Anne Lumagui Santos-Agoncillo
 Jun Robles Lana
 Kristopher King
 Mamang (Produced and Directed by: Denise O’Hara)
Martina Eileen Hernandez delas Alas-Sibayan
 Maxine Eigenmann
 Musmos na Sumibol sa Gubat ng Digma (Mac Cosico)
 Palabas: A Country in Moving Pictures (Produced and Directed by: Arjanmar H. Rebeta)
Rina Marie Padilla Raymundo
 Rody Vera
 Signal Rock (Produced and Directed by: Chito Ro?o)
 Wing Chair (Produced and Directed by: Arjanmar H. Rebeta)

Dance

 Angelo Marquez and Stephanie Sabalo
Bayanihan
 Halili-Cruz Dance Company
 Lairca Reigne Nicdao
 Sean Mischa Aranar and Ana Leonila Nualla
 Mark Jayson Gayon and Mary Joy Renigen
 Wilbert Aunzo and Pearl Marie Cañeda

Literary Arts

Bienvenido Lumbera
 Kristian Sendon Cordero
 Ricardo de Ungria

Music

 Acapellago
 Imusicapella
 Joana Ruth Tumpalan
 Ligao National High School Voice Choral
 Mark Raeniel B. Agpasa
 Nilo Alcala
 Ramon Lijauco, Jr.
 UP Los Banos Choral Ensemble

Visual Arts

 AllanRey Salazar
 Anthony Into
 Celso Beringuel Creer II
 Danilo O. Victoriano, Jr.
 Donell C. Gumiran
 Glenn Campanilla
 Jesus Ramos Tejada
 Jophel Botero Ybiosa
 Jun Epifanio Pagalilauan
 Leonard Pauig Ranjo
 Maria Felicity Tejada
 Marwin Javier
 Mia Serano
 Rhedel Cabrera Sy
 Rogel Cabisidan
 Worth Wisdom Lodriga

2019 
11th Ani ng Dangal Awards

2018
10th Ani ng Dangal Awards: Sixty-two (62) Filipinos from different fields of arts was honored by the National Commission for Culture and the Arts (NCCA) through its annual Ani ng Dangal Awards.  32 artists in cinema, 4 artists in dance, 2 in dramatic arts, 2 in literary arts, 8 artists in music, and 14 in visual arts
Venue: Marble Hall, Ayuntamineto Building, Intramuros, Manila
Date: February 26, 2018

Cinema
Ai-Ai Delas Alas, “Area”
Allen Dizon, “Bomba”
Ana Capri, “Laut”
Angel Locsin, “Everything About Her”
Angeli Nicole Sanoy, “Bomba”
Hasmine Killip, “Pamilya Ordinaryo”
Iza Calzado, "Bliss"
Ronwaldo Martin, “Pamilya Ordinaryo”
Ricky Davao, “Dayang Asu”
Brillante Mendoza, director
Lav Diaz, director
Louie Ignacio, director
Raymund Ribay Gutierrez, director
Sheron Dayoc, director
Gino Jose, director
Bianca Balbuena, film producer
Jona Ballaran, costume designer
Lawrence Fajardo, editor
“Contestant #4”
“E. Del Mundo”
“Fatima Marie Torres and The Invasion Of Space Shuttle Pinas 25”
“Flip the Record”
“Imago”
“Maria”
“Paglipay”
Pamilya Ordinaryo"
“Pauwi Na”
“Pitong Kabang Palay”
“Saving Sally”
“Sunday Beauty Queen”
“Women of the Weeping River”
“1st Sem”

Dramatic Arts
Dulaang Filipino
Mary Gracielle Burce So

Literary Arts
Gina Apostol
Luisa Igloria

Music
Acapellago
Cipriano de Guzman Jr.
Darlin Joy Baje
Imusicapella
Phisix
Roi Aldric Trawon
University of Mindanao Chorale
UPLB Choral Ensemble

Dance
Halili-Cruz Dance Company
Kristel De Catalina
Power Impact Dancers Sirens
Upeeps

Visual Arts
Ainer Brean Padrigo
Bernard Pasatiempo Recirdo 2nd
Danilo Victoriano
Donell Gumiran
Edwin Loyola
Jaime Sumugat Singlador
Jophel Botero Ybiosa
Jose Melencio Brillo
Maria Angelica Tejada
Maria Felicity Tejada
Martha Atienza
Baloize Art Prize
Ramon Castillo
Worth Lodriga

2017
9th Ani ng Dangal Awards: Seventy-one (71) Filipinos from different fields of arts was  honored by the National Commission for Culture and the Arts (NCCA) through its annual Ani ng Dangal Awards.
Venue: Samsung Hall of SM Aura in Bonifacio Global City, Taguig
Date: February 27, 2017

Cinema
John Lloyd Cruz
Jaclyn Jose
Ang Babaeng Humayo/Ang Araw Bago Ang Wakas (by Lav Diaz); 
Allan Michael Ibanez and Dexter Paglinawan Hemedez (for 1st Sem)
 Allen Dizon (for Iaadya mo Kami); 
Apocalypse Child (by Mario Cornejo; producer Monster Jimenez); 
Barbie Forteza (for Laut); 
Birdshot (by Mikhael Red); 
Brillante Mendoza (for Ma. Rosa)
Child Hauz (by Louie Ignacio, producer Baby Go)
E Del Mundo (for Manong ng Paaling)
Eduardo Roy Jr. (for Pamilya Ordinaryo)
Emerson Quintillan Texon (for Tomadachi)
Gemini (by Ato Bautista)
Gian Carlo Escamilla (for Walang Take Two)
Hamog (by Ralston Jover)
Happy New Year (by Joseph Israel Laban)
Hasmine Killip (for Pamilya Ordinaryo)
Imago (by Raymond Ribay Gutierrez)
Kirby Asunto (for Exist)
Lucky Jinx (for Giovanni Baldisseri)
Leon Miguel (for Red lights)
Nathalie Hart (for Siphayo)
Paolo Ballesteros (for Die Beautiful)
Ricky Lee
Sandra (by Carlo Francisco Manatad)
Scarecrow (by Zig Dulay)
Sid Lucero (for Toto)
Marissa Sue M. Prado (for The Sister)
The Crescent Rising (Sheron Dayoc)
The Equation (by Rhoda Joy Blaza)
The Sister (by Marco Felipe Villas Lopez)
Teri Malvar (for Hamog)
Tomodachi (by Joel Lamangan)
Toto (by John Paul Su)
Traslacion (Ang Paglalakad sa Altar ng Alanganin)
Walang Take Two (by Iglesia ni Cristo's INCinema Production )

Dramatic Arts
Clint Ramos

Literary Arts
Wilfredo Pascual, Jr.

Music
Acapellago
Andrea Melisa Camba
Balon Dagupan Children's Choir
Dennis Deovdes Reyes, III
Ligao National High School Voice Choral
Philippine Madrigal Singers 
UP Medicine Choir

Dance
Asian Pride
Cage
Fmd Extreme
Halili Cruz Dance Company
Jamaica Jornacion and Kristel De Catalina
Junior New System
Kahayag Dance Company
Luckesly Maravilla
Neil John Casagan and Renzo Arboleda
Olivia Bogayong
Rica Angela Ingco
Sanglahi Dance Troupe
Shaira May Comeros
Tarlac State University Performing Dance Troupe
Upeepz 
XB GenSan.

Visual Arts
Allan Fesalbon Castaneda, 
Ananda Wisely
Danny Victoriano
Jamia Mei Tolentino
Joel Forte
Jophel Botero Ybiosa
Maria Angelica Tejada
Norman B. Isaac
Tanam (coffee-table book) 
Trisha Co. Reyes

2016
8th Ani ng Dangal Awards:Eighty Three (83) Filipinos from different fields of arts will be honored by the National Commission for Culture and the Arts (NCCA) through its annual Ani ng Dangal Awards.

Venue: Samsung Hall of SM Aura in Bonifacio Global City, Taguig
Date: February 29, 2016

Architecture and Allied Arts
Christian Salandanan

Broadcast Arts
GMA 7's Front Row

Cinema
Nora Aunor
Cherie Gil
Aiko Melendez 
Albert Chan Paran, 
Allen Dizon 
Benjamin Tolentino
Brillante Mendoza 
Carlo Enciso Catu
Epy Quizon 
Emilio Garcia 
Joseph Israel Laban
Jun Lana 
Lemuel Lorca
Sid Lucero 
Liza Diño 
LJ Reyes 
Louie Ignacio 
Micko Laurente 
Ralston Javier 
Richard Gomez 
Sigrid Andrea Bernardo 
Carlo Enciso Catu 
Kidlat Tahimik 
Zig Dulay 
Benito Bautista
Francis Xavier Pasion, 
Roderick Cabrido, 
Perci Intalan
Jeffrey Jeturian
Will Fredo
Louise Isabel Mendoza, 
Ida Anita Del Mundo
Joel Lamangan 
Gabby Fernandez
Jason Paul Laxamana
Nash Ang
Reggie Entienza
Carlo Obispo
Christian Lat
Khavn De La Cruz
Janice O’Hara
Antoinette Jadaone
Don Frasco
Anj Macalanda
Brilliante Ma. Mendoza

Music
Acapellago
Aleron Choir
Anna Tabita Abeleda-Piquero
Ateneo Chamber Singers
Boscorale
Imusicapella
Kammerchor Manila
Los Cantantes de Manila
Ryan Tamondong
Triple Fret
University of Visayas Chorale
University of the Philippines Concert Chorus
University of the Philippines Manila Chorale
University of Santo Tomas Singers

Dance
Bayanihan National Folkdance Company
Halili-Cruz School of Ballet
Jamaica France Jornacion 
Lawrence Santiago
Klivert John Mendoza
Sayawatha 
Upeepz

Dramatic Arts
Bernardo Bernardo 
Jhett Tolentino 
Rachelle Ann Go

Visual Arts
Ana Katrina Miranda
Ananda Wisely
Herbert Bagolbagol
Jamia Mei Tolentino
Jamille Bianca Aguilar
John Herrera
Jophel Botero Ybiosa
Maria Angelica Tejada
Mandy Javillonar
Robert Anton Aparante
Ruston Banal 
Trisha Co Reyes.

2015
7th Ani ng Dangal Awards:Several Filipinos from different fields of arts was  honored by the National Commission for Culture and the Arts (NCCA) through its annual Ani ng Dangal Awards.
Venue:Old Senate Hall, National Museum
Date: February 13, 2015

Cinema
Lav Diaz
Jun Lana 
Ronnie Quizon, 
Jake Cuenca
Liza Diño, 
Allen Dizon 
Diane Ventura
Justen Aguillon
Nerissa Picadizo
Sandy Talag 
Miggs Cuaderno.
Siege Ledesma's “Shift,” 
Patricia Evangelista's “The Barber of Guiuan,” 
Will Fredo and Ida Tiongson's “In Nomine Matris,” 
Joel Lamangan's “Kamkam,” 
Francis Pasion's “Bwaya,” 
Roberto Reyes Ang's “TNT,” 
Carlo Obispo's “Purok 7,” 
Eduardo Roy's “Quick Change,” 
Pamela Reyes and Mikhail Red's “Rekorder.”
Vilma Santos

Broadcast  Arts
Leo Katigbak
 GMA 7 - Bayan Ko

Literary Arts
Sophia Marie Lee

Music
Lloyd Edisonne Judilla Montebon, 
Novo Concertante Manila Choir, 
The Saint Louis University Glee Club, 
Alvin Paulin 
Aleron Choir.

Dance
Halili-Cruz Ballet Company
A Team, 
Xtreme Dancers, 
Johnny Sustantivo Villanueva, 
Miguel Leopoldo, 
Kayleen Mae Ortiz 
Margaret Chua Lao.

Visual Arts
Ronnie Dayo
 Robert John Cabagnot
Glenn Isaac, Mario Cardenas, 
Kenneth Cobonpue
Jophel Botero Ybiosa, 
Gina Meneses, 
Phoebelyn Gullunan
Jamille Blanca Aguilar, 
 Jaime Singlador 
Danilo Victoriano
Ruston Banal, 
Trisha Co Reyes, 
Justen Paul Tolentino, 
Jamia Mei Tolentino, 
Jesus Ramos Tejada 
Maria Angelica Tejada.

2014
6th Ani ng Dangal Awards:  Fifty-seven artists from different fields of arts will be honored by the National Commission for Culture and the Arts (NCCA) through the Ani ng Dangal Awards

Venue:Newport Performing Arts Theater, Resorts World Manila
Date: February 2, 2014

Architecture
Bridgebury Realty Corp. 
Maria Cecilia Cruz

Cinema
Nora Aunor
Adrielle Esteban
Alessandra de Rossi
Anita Linda 
Auraeus Solito,
Barbara Miguel
Briccio Santos
Brillante Ma. Mendoza, 
Dwein Baltazar, 
Eddie Garcia 
Emmanuel Quindo Palo
Kidlat Tahimik, 
Eugene Domingo 
Gutierrez “Teng” Mangansakan II, 
Ian Loreños, 
Inshallah Montero, 
Jericho Rosales 
Joel Torre 
Jun Robles Lana,  
Marilen Magsaysay, 
Paul Sta. Ana, 
Roger Kyle “Bugoy” Cariño, 
Ron Morales
Roy Iglesias, 
Sandy Talag, 
Jameelah Rose del Prado Lineses

Literary Arts
Merlie M. Alunan

Dramatic Arts
Clint Ramos

Music
Beverly Caimen, 
De La Salle University Chorale, 
Hail Mary the Queen Children's Choir (Immaculate Concepcion Cathedral in Cubao), 
Aldeza Ianna dela Torre, 
Jed Madela

Dance
Bayanihan, Boyz Unlimited
Halili-Cruz School of Ballet

Multi Disciplinary
Eric de los Santos, 
ABS-CBN's “Matanglawin: Pasig River Earth Day Special,” 
Nanoy Rafael, 
Philip Jerome Vaquilar, 
GMA News TV's “Reel Time,” 
Sergio Bumatay III, 
Pupil, 
Jason Tan

Visual Arts
Manny Fajutag, 
Norman B. Isaac, 
Robert John Cabagnot, 
Trisha Co. Reyes, 
Raymundo Folch, 
Orley Ypon, 
Aaron Favila, 
Jhon Vincent Redrico, 
Bianca Jamille Aguilar, 
Jamia Mei Tolentino, 
Lord Ahzrin Bacalla, 
Maria Angelica Ramos Tejada, 
Joel C. Forte
Jerrica Shi

2013
The 5th Ani ng Dangal Award: The National Commission on Culture and the Arts honored Filipinos in various artistic disciplines last night at the Cultural Center of the Philippines during the 5th Ani ng Dangal Awards, the culminating event of this year's National Arts Month.
Venue:'Cultural Center of the Philippines
Date: March 8, 2013

Architecture and Allied Arts
Arch. Abelardo Tolentino, Jr. 
Aidea Philippines, Inc.
Kenneth Cobonpue, “Cabaret Sofa”

Cinema
Nora Aunor, “Thy Womb”
Adrian Sibal, “The Rivals”
Auraeus Solito, “Busong”
Brillante Mendoza, “Thy Womb”
Charles Andrew Flamiano, “Letting Go, Letting God”
Christopher Gozum, “Anacbuana”
Eduardo Roy, Jr., “Bahay Bata”
John Paul Su, “Pagpag”
Lav Diaz, “Florentinahubaldo, CTE”
Lawrence Fajardo, “Posas”
Marlon Rivera, “Ang Babae sa Septic Tank”
Brandon Relucio & Ivan Zaldarriaga, “Di Ingon ‘Nato”
Marty Syjuco, “Give Up Tomorrow”
Shamaine Buencamino, “Niño”
Will Fredo, “The Caregiver”

Dramatic Arts
Peter De Guzman, “The Romance of Magno Rubio”

Literary Arts
Romulo Baquiran, Jr.

Multi-Disciplinary Arts
BBDO Guerrero
Kara David, i-Witness GMA 7
Sarah Geronimo
Wansapanataym, ABS-CBN Corporation

Dance
Candice Adea
Halili Cruz Dance Company
Irina Feleo (Bayanihan Philippine National Folk Dance Company)
Peter Laurent Callangan (Bayanihan Philippine National Folk Dance Company)
The Crew

Music
Arwin Tan
Baao Children's Choir
Edgardo “Ed” Lumbera Manguiat
Imusicapella
Joseleo Ciballos Logdat
Miriam College High School Glee Club
Muntinlupa Science High School Chorale
Novo Concertante Manila Choir
Samiweng Singers, Ilocos Norte National High School (INNHS)
University of the Philippines Singing Ambassadors,
UP Concert Chorus

Visual Arts
Engr. Jaime Sumugat Singlador
George Tapan
Jamia Mei Tolentino
Jamille Bianca Aguilar
Zohayma Montañer
Joel C. Forte
Jophel Ybiosa
Trisha Co Reyes

2012
The 4th Ani ng Dangal Award: The Ani ng Dangal awards are being handed out annually by the National Commission for Culture and the Arts (NCCA) to artists who have earned international awards and accolades during the past year.  For this year, a total of 32 artists from different fields of the arts were given the recognition
Venue:'Malacañang Palace
Date: February 28, 2012

Cinema
Michael Manalastas, 
Gym Lumbera and Ellen Ramos, 
Rica Arevalo and Sarah Roxas, 
Jeffrey Jeturian, 
Loy Arcenas, 
Auraeus Solito, 
Remton Siega Zuasola, 
Sheron Dayoc, Liza Diño 
Rianne Hill Soriano
Jericho Rosales

Multi-Disciplinary Arts
Boy Abunda
Lea Salonga

Dance
Halili-Cruz School of Ballet 
Bayanihan 
The Philippine National Folk Dance Company
Boyz Unlimited

Music
Imusicapella, 
Tristan Ignacio, 
Ateneo de Manila College Glee Club
AUP Ambassadors Chorale Arts Society, 
Mandaue Children and Youth Chorus
Cebu Chamber Singers 
Ilocos Norte National High School;

Visual Arts
 Cherrie Marie de Guzman-Ipapo, 
Eric Olympia Fajut, 
Gerry Alanguilan
Danilo Victoriano, 
Trisha Co Reyes, 
Jamille Bianca Tan Aguilar, 
Ma. Angelica Tejada, 
Jesus Tejada, 
Jamia Mei Tolentino, 
 Rodel Tapaya
Reynaldo Mondez, 
Niccolo Cosme
Jophel Ybiosa

2011
The 3rd Ani ng Dangal Award: The National Commission for Culture and the Arts, continues with its tradition of recognizing Filipino excellence in the arts, by awarding 32 individuals/groups with its annual Ani ng Dangal awards
Venue:Sofitel Plaza Hotel
Date: February 28, 2011

Cinema
Nash Ang Gahan “isKWATER” and “Water”
Rustica Carpio “Lola”
Odyssey Flores “Lola”
Ralston Jover “Bakal Boys”
Monster Jimenez “Kano: An American and His Harem”
Anita Linda “Lola”
Jose Mateo “Prep and Landing”
Mark Meilly “Donor”
Brillante Mendoza “Lola”
Francis Xavier Pasion “Jay”
John Paul Seniel “Latus”
Meryll Soriano “Donor”
Lou Veloso “Colorum”
Paolo Villaluna and Ellen Ramos “Walang Hanggang Paalam”

Multi-Disciplinary Arts
INQUIRER.net “Anong Balita”
 Niña Corpuz “Filipino Domestic Workets: The Struggle for Justice and Survival”
i-Witness “Ambulansiyang de Paa”

Literary
Marjorie Evasco

Dance
Halili-Cruz School of Ballet

Music
Marielle Corpuz 
 Margaret Ortega
Lordenn Panganiban “Within” and “Love Like Way Back then”
Philippine Normal University Chorale
Vehnee Saturno “Within”
University of Saint La Salle Chorale
 University of Santo Tomas Singers

Visual Arts
Carlos Esguerra “Chrysler Building 8369”
Marvin Langote “My World My Dream”
Jerome Allen Lorico “A dress inspired by Ink and Water”
Vance Galvin Tiu Tangcueco “Here is My Life”
Orley Ypon “The Seekers”

2010
The 2nd Ani ng Dangal Award: The National Commission for Culture and the Arts, continues with its tradition of recognizing Filipino excellence in the arts, by awarding 41 individuals/groups with its annual Ani ng Dangal awards
Venue: Rizal Hall, Malacanang Palace
Date: February 26, 2010

Cinema
Brillante  Mendoza, 
Teresa Barrozo, 
Pepe Diokno, 
Gina Pareño, 
Raya Xavier
Francis Pasion 
Alvin Yapan. 
Mark Reyes,
Sherad Anthony Sanchez

Multi-Disciplinary Arts
Imelda Abano, 
ABSCBN Broadcasting Inc., 
ABS-CBN Foundation Inc., 
Ayala Group of Malls, 
GMA Network Inc., 
Mary Anne Therese Manuson 
QTV11 Entertainment

Dance
Halili-Cruz School of Ballet
Amplified Hip-Hop Dance Group, 
Rhosam Prudenciado
Quezon City Ballet and the University

Literary
Abdon Balde Jr.
Gemino Abad

Music
Young Voices of the Adventist University of the Philippines  
Ritchie Asibal, 
The Calasiao Children's Chorus
Capitol University Glee Club
Mandaue Children's Choir, 
Novo Concernante 
Mobbstarr: Dice and K9, 
Rhap Salazar
Beverly Claudine Shangkuan
University of Santo Tomas Singers, 
University of the Visayas Chorale 
The Young Voices of Negros

Visual Arts
Ramon Castillo
Ernesto Dul-Ang
Erwin Lim, 
Prudencio DengCoy Miel, 
Nikki Sandino Victoriano 
Jophel Ybiosa.

2009
1st Ani ng Dangal Awards: The inaugural awards were given by the National Commission for Culture and the Arts

Music

(Individual category) 

 Nilo Alcala
 Vina Morales
 Reymond Sajor
 Catherine Loria
 Aria Clemente

Music

(Chorale and Band category) 

 Las Piñas Boys Choir, 
 Kilyawan Boys Choir, 
 The Philippine Normal University Chorale, 
 The Himig Singers, 
 University of the Philippines Madrigal Singers, 
 University of the East Chorale, 
 Novo Concertante Manila, 
 Sta. Teresita Parish Chorale, 
 The Mapua Concert Singers, 
 Chiang Kai Sheik College Youth Choir, 
 The University of the Philippines Singing Ambassadors, 
 Coro de Sta. Cecilia, Cebu Chamber Singers, 
 Lyceum of the Philippines Chorale, 
 Mandaue Children’s Choir, 
 Hail Mary the Queen Children’s Choir, 
 Vox Angeli Children’s Choir, 
 The University of Northeastern Philippines Chorale, 
 Kjwan Band 
 KHP Coro Techniuv.

Dance 

 Halili-Cruz School of Ballet, 
 Quezon City Ballet, 
 Bayanihan Philippine National Folk Dance Company, 
 Philippine All Stars 
 Janssen Knights.

Film 

 “Melancholia” by Lav Diaz, 
 “Foster Child” by Brillante Mendoza, 
 “Tirador” by Brillante Mendoza, 
 “NEO-LOUNGE” by Joanna Vasquez-Arong, Ricky Davao, Brillante Mendoza, Emilio Garcia, Cherrie Pie Picache, Yul Servo, and Sid Lucero.

Visual Arts 

 Joe Datuin, 
 Remster Bautista 
 Bernardo Matudan, 
 Imelda Cajipe Endaya, 
 Ross Capili.

Puppetry/Broadcast and Communication Arts 

 “Reporter’s Notebook” of GMA-7 
 Power to Unite Catholic Family Bible Group, Inc.

Literature 

 Elmer A. Ordoñez
 Michael M. Coroza
 Miguel Syjuco

See also
Cultural Center of the Philippines
National Commission for Culture and the Arts

References

External links
Official Facebook Page
Official Twitter Account
National Commission for Culture and the Arts of the Philippines Homepage
 Read more on Rappler

Arts in the Philippines